Western Guo was a vassal state in China during the Zhou Dynasty. "Guo" was a kinship group that held at least five pieces of territory within the Zhou realm at various times.

After King Wu of Zhou destroyed the Shang Dynasty in 1046 BCE, his uncle Guo Shu received grants of land at Yong. The rulers of Western Guo held administrative positions in the court of the Zhou Kings through successive generations. A branch of Western Guo later founded Eastern Guo.

Due to harassment and invasion by the Quanrong tribes Western Guo moved eastwards, eventually migrating to Sanmenxia in the Yellow River valley between Xi'an and Luoyang. A new capital was built at Shangyang (上阳) straddling both banks of the Yellow River. Shangyang was called "Southern Guo" (南虢) and Xiayang (下阳) "Northern Guo" (北虢). Later chronicles often became confused with the relationships among the various Guo's, but archaeological discoveries support the view that Northern and Southern Guo were both parts of Western Guo.

In 655 BCE Western Guo was destroyed by the Duke Xian of Jin. (Jin first asked permission of the state of Yu to pass through its territory. After conquering Guo it conquered Yu. This was one of the Thirty-Six Stratagems). The Guo leader Guo Gong Chou fled to the Zhou capital Luoyang along with some of the Guo nobility. Some time later they arrived in the State of Wen at the home of Guo Gong Chou's father in law. Afterwards some of the nobility along with a number of civilians were captured by the Jin Army and taken to the area of what is now Fenyang, Shanxi Province where they became a prominent family with the name Guo. The remainder of the group either settled down in the locality or fled elsewhere.

At the same time, people in Western Guo, with the help of the Qiang people, were attempting to build a new state amongst the ruins of the old one, known historically as Xiao Guo (小虢). This was the last in a total of five states called Guo.

In 687 BCE, during the Spring and Autumn period, the State of Qin wiped out Xiao Guo.

Rulers

Notes

.
.
.
.

References

Zhou dynasty